The 1998 Hackney Council election took place on 7 May 1998 to elect members of Hackney London Borough Council in London, England. The whole council was up for election and the council went in no overall control.

Background

Election result

Ward results

References

1998
1998 London Borough council elections